Johannes Vall (born 19 October 1992) is a Swedish footballer who plays for ÍA

Career

Club career
Vall started playing football in Skrea IF when he was 5–6 years old. Later during his youth years, he moved to Falkenbergs FF. He made his debut for the clubs professional team against IFK Norrköping in the last round of the 2009 Superettan. The match ended 1-1 and Vall was replaced in the 82nd minute. In the 2010 season, he played three matches, all as a substitute. In 2011, Vall played eight matches, of which three matches from the start and made one assist. After the season, he extended his contract by two years.

During the 2012 and 2013 seasons, he played a total of 14 matches due to a lot of injuries. During his Allsvenskan debut season, Vall played 22 matches, three from the start, and he scored four goals. In December 2014, he extended his contract by two years. During the 2016 season, he mainly played as a left back. In December 2016, he extended his contract by one year.

In August 2017, Vall was signed by IFK Norrköping, where he signed a 2.5-year contract. In July 2019, Vall was loaned out to Östers IF for the rest of the 2019 season.

On 13 January 2020, Vall was recruited by Ljungskile SK, where he signed a one-year contract. On 18 February 2021 it was announced Vall had signed for the Icelandic champions Valur.

References

External links
 
 

1992 births
Living people
Swedish footballers
Association football midfielders
Falkenbergs FF players
IFK Norrköping players
Östers IF players
Ljungskile SK players
Allsvenskan players
Superettan players
People from Falkenberg
Sportspeople from Halland County